The 1960 Boston College Eagles baseball team represented Boston College in the 1960 NCAA University Division baseball season. The Eagles played their home games at Alumni Field. The team was coached by Eddie Pellagrini in his 3rd year at Boston College.

The Eagles won the District I Playoff to advanced to the College World Series, where they were defeated by the Oklahoma State Cowboys.

Roster

Schedule 

! style="" | Regular Season
|- valign="top" 

|- align="center" bgcolor="#ffcccc"
| 1 || April 7 || at  || Unknown • Medford, Massachusetts || 3–4 || 0–1 || 0–1
|- align="center" bgcolor="#ccffcc"
| 2 || April 9 ||  || Alumni Field • Boston, Massachusetts || 6–0 || 1–1 || 1–1
|- align="center" bgcolor="#ccffcc"
| 3 || April 19 ||  || Alumni Field • Boston, Massachusetts || 8–1 || 2–1 || 2–1
|- align="center" bgcolor="#ccffcc"
| 4 || April 20 || at  || Unknown • Boston, Massachusetts || 4–3 || 3–1 || 3–1
|- align="center" bgcolor="#ccffcc"
| 5 || April 23 || at  || Alumni Field • Boston, Massachusetts || 11–3 || 4–1 || 3–1
|- align="center" bgcolor="#ccffcc"
| 6 || April 25 || at  || Parsons Field • Brookline, Massachusetts || 12–5 || 5–1 || 4–1
|- align="center" bgcolor="#ccffcc"
| 7 || April 26 || at  || Joseph J. O'Donnell Field • Boston, Massachusetts || 13–4 || 6–1 || 5–1
|- align="center" bgcolor="#ccffcc"
| 8 || April 30 ||  || Alumni Field • Boston, Massachusetts || 8–4 || 7–1 || 5–1
|-

|- align="center" bgcolor="#ffcccc"
| 9 || May 4 ||  || Alumni Field • Boston, Massachusetts || 5–14 || 7–2 || 5–2
|- align="center" bgcolor="#ccffcc"
| 10 || May  ||  || Unknown • Unknown || 6–5 || 8–2 || 5–2
|- align="center" bgcolor="#ffcccc"
| 11 || May 12 ||  || Alumni Field • Boston, Massachusetts || 7–8 || 8–3 || 5–2
|- align="center" bgcolor="#ccffcc"
| 12 || May 14 || at Providence || Unknown • Providence, Rhode Island || 10–7 || 9–3 || 5–2
|- align="center" bgcolor="#ccffcc"
| 13 || May 16 || Northeastern || Alumni Field • Boston, Massachusetts || 4–3 || 10–3 || 6–2
|- align="center" bgcolor="#ccffcc"
| 14 || May 19 || Tufts || Alumni Field • Boston, Massachusetts || 7–4 || 11–3 || 7–2
|- align="center" bgcolor="#ffcccc"
| 15 || May 30 || at  || Fitton Field • Worcester, Massachusetts || – || 11–4 || 7–3
|-

|-
|-
! style="" | Postseason
|- valign="top"

|- align="center" bgcolor="#ccffcc"
| 16 || June 4 || vs  || AIC Park • Springfield, Massachusetts || 2–1 || 12–4 || 7–3
|- align="center" bgcolor="#ccffcc"
| 17 || June 5 || vs Holy Cross || AIC Park • Springfield, Massachusetts || 5–4 || 13–4 || 7–3
|-

|- align="center" bgcolor="#ccffcc"
| 18 || June 10 || Holy Cross || Alumni Field • Boston, Massachusetts || – || 14–4 || 7–3
|-

|- align="center" bgcolor="#ccffcc"
| 19 || June 14 || vs Colorado State College || Omaha Municipal Stadium • Omaha, Nebraska || 8–3 || 15–4 || 7–3
|- align="center" bgcolor="#ffcccc"
| 20 || June 16 || vs Southern California || Omaha Municipal Stadium • Omaha, Nebraska || 2–5 || 15–5 || 7–3
|- align="center" bgcolor="#ffcccc"
| 21 || June 17 || vs Oklahoma State || Omaha Municipal Stadium • Omaha, Nebraska || 0–1 || 15–6 || 7–3
|-

|-
|

References 

Boston College Eagles baseball seasons
Boston College Eagles baseball
College World Series seasons
Boston College